Stożne may refer to the following places:
Stożne, Lubusz Voivodeship (west Poland)
Stożne, Ełk County in Warmian-Masurian Voivodeship (north Poland)
Stożne, Olecko County in Warmian-Masurian Voivodeship (north Poland)